Henry Harold Kennedy Jr. (born February 22, 1948) is an inactive Senior United States district judge of the United States District Court for the District of Columbia.

Education and career

Born in Columbia, South Carolina, Kennedy graduated with an A.B. from the Princeton School of Public and International Affairs (then the Woodrow Wilson School of Public and International Affairs) in 1970 after completing a senior thesis titled "Black Politics in Indiana, 1888-1900." He later received a J.D. from Harvard Law School in 1973. Following graduation, he worked for the law firm of Reavis, Pogue, Neal and Rose in Washington, D.C. Subsequent to this he was an Assistant United States Attorney for the District of Columbia between 1973 and 1976. He served as a United States Magistrate of the United States District Court for the District of Columbia between 1976 and 1979. He was appointed Associate Judge of the Superior Court of the District of Columbia in December 1979 where he served until he was appointed as a federal judge in September 1997.

Federal judicial service

On May 15, 1997, Kennedy was nominated by President Clinton to a seat on the United States District Court for the District of Columbia vacated by Joyce Hens Green. Kennedy was confirmed by the United States Senate on September 4, 1997, and received his commission on September 18, 1997. He took senior status on November 18, 2011 due to a certified disability and is currently in inactive senior status.

Personal life

He is married to Altomease Rucker Kennedy, a lawyer who is a partner with the firm of Sanford Heisler Sharp, where she specializes in False Claims Act litigation. She is the author of a novel, Friends and Lovers in Black and White. They have two daughters, Morgan and Alexandra, both of whom are graduates of Princeton University. Kennedy's brother, Randall Kennedy, is a professor at Harvard Law School. His sister, Angela Kennedy Acree, is a lawyer with the District of Columbia Public Defender Service.

Notable cases

In November 2007, Kennedy ordered the Bush White House to preserve its emails.
On January 9, 2008, Kennedy rejected a request from terror suspects held at Guantanamo Bay seeking a court hearing into the destruction of interrogation tapes by the CIA in 2005.
On August 16, 2010, Kennedy ruled that Guantanamo Bay detainee Adnan Farhan Abd Al Latif could not be held by the U.S. government. Kennedy found that the government's key piece of evidence, a heavily redacted intelligence report, was not sufficiently reliable to justify Latif's detention. The D.C. Circuit later reversed this ruling, holding that Kennedy should have accorded a presumption of regularity to the report. Commentators have criticized the D.C. Circuit's reversal of Kennedy's reliability holding.
On June 24, 2011, Kennedy issued a ruling addressing the role of the U.S. Constitution's Speech or Debate Clause in federal legislative branch employment lawsuits. He held that the Speech or Debate Clause barred discrimination and retaliation claims that could not be proven without inquiry into internal legislative branch communications, but held that such claims could go forward if the supposedly protected legislative explanation for the challenged employment action could be shown to be pretextual without inquiry into protected legislative activity.

See also 
 List of African-American federal judges
 List of African-American jurists

References

External links

1948 births
Living people
African-American judges
Assistant United States Attorneys
Harvard Law School alumni
Judges of the United States District Court for the District of Columbia
Judges presiding over Guantanamo habeas petitions
Lawyers from Columbia, South Carolina
Princeton University alumni
Judges of the Superior Court of the District of Columbia
United States Department of Justice lawyers
United States district court judges appointed by Bill Clinton
United States magistrate judges
20th-century American judges
21st-century American judges